Miss International Queen 2022, the 16th Miss International Queen pageant was held on 25 June 2022 at Pattaya, Chonburi province in Thailand. Valentina Fluchaire of Mexico crowned Fuschia Anne Ravena of the Philippines as her successor at the end of the event. This is the third time that the Philippines claimed the title.

Results 

Notes:

§ – placed into the Top 11 by winning Miss Popular Vote.

Special awards

Best in Talent

Contestants 
23 contestants competed for the title.

Notes

Debuts 

Paraguay competed in Miss International Queen for the first time.

Returning countries 

 Puerto Rico last competed in 2009.
 Cambodia last competed in 2016.
 Colombia and Honduras last competed in 2018.
 Canada, Ecuador, Korea and Venezuela last competed in 2019.

Withdrawals 

 Australia, China, Norway, Singapore, and Sweden withdrew for unspecified reasons.

Other notes 
 Moe Moe Lay of Myanmar dropped out from the contest.
 Sasha Montez of Cabo Verde and Shyraa Roy of Pakistan were expected to debut in Miss International Queen 2022 but did not compete due to lack of sponsorship.

References 

2022 beauty pageants
2022